"Wavy Gravy" is an instrumental by Welsh DJ Sasha, released as the single from his second studio album, Airdrawndagger. The song features co-production from Charlie May and Simon Wright. It peaked at number 64 on the UK Singles Chart. It is well known for the amateur remix contest which led to the track being remixed by hundreds of producers.

Background
In 2003, a remix contest was announced for the song. Troy Stoner of Tallahassee won first place for his drum 'n' bass remix. After the success of the remix contest, the individual parts of every track from Airdrawndagger were released for remixing by anyone. The single was released with an alternative mix of "Wavy Gravy" (named "4DJS") as well as "Fundamental", an instrumental also from Airdrawndagger.

Track listing

Charts

References

External links
 

2002 singles
2002 songs